West Anstey is a village and civil parish on the River Yeo, about 5 miles west of Dulverton, in the North Devon district, in the county of Devon, England. In 2011 the parish had a population of 163. The parish touches Molland, East Anstey and Withypool and Hawkridge.

Features 
There are 26 listed buildings in West Anstey, In 1881 it had its own postman and school.

History 
Anstey was recorded in the Domesday Book as Anestinge. The name "Anstey" probably means 'steep narrow footpath'. Alternative names for West Anstey are "Anstey West" and "Anstey". The parish was historically in the South Molton hundred.

References

External links 

Villages in Devon
North Devon